The 2009 North African Cup of Champions was the second edition of the competition initiated by the North African Football Union (UNAF). Algerian side ES Sétif were crowned champions after beating Tunisian champions ES Tunis in a penalty shootout in the final. Midfielder Hocine Metref was chosen as the Best Player of the competition, while goalkeeper Faouzi Chaouchi was chosen as the Best Goalkeeper.

Participating teams
 ES Sétif (2008-09 Algerian Championnat National Champions)
 ES Tunis (2008-09 Tunisian Ligue Professionnelle Champions)
 Ittihad Tripoli (2008-09 Libyan Premier League Champions)
 Raja Casablanca (2008-09 Botola Champions)

Draw
The draw was made in Djerba, Tunisia on 25 July 2009 at an UNAF meeting.

Semi finals

First Legs

Second Legs

ES Sétif go through with an aggregate score of 3–1

ES Tunis go through with an aggregate score of 4–3.

Final

First leg

Second leg

Champions

References

External links
goalzz.com 

2009
2009 in African football
2009–10 in Moroccan football
2009–10 in Algerian football
2009–10 in Libyan football
2009–10 in Tunisian football